Ahad is a Middle Eastern given forename primarily used by Muslims and Jews. It is also used as a family name (surname) (e.g. Oli Ahad).

In Arabic Ahad means "one (of)" and is usually used in negation or to  indicate part of a whole.

Given name
 Ahad bint Abdullah (born 1971), Omani royal
 Ahad Ha'am, pen name of Asher Ginsberg (1856–1927), Hebrew writer
 Ahad Israfil (1972–2019), American shooting survivor
 Ahad Pazaj (born 1970), Iranian wrestler
 Ahad Raza Mir (born 1993), Pakistani actor

Surname
 Abdul Ahad (music director) (1918–1996), Bangladeshi musical artist
 Ghaith Abdul-Ahad (born 1975), Iraqi journalist
 Oli Ahad (1928–2012), Bangladeshi politician
 Samia Ahad, Pakistani chef

Fictional character
 Altaïr Ibn-La'Ahad, a Levantine member of the Assassin Order, main character of the videogame series Assassin's Creed.

Religion
 Al-Ahad Names of God in Islam

References

Arabic-language surnames
Arabic masculine given names
Names of God in Islam
Arabic feminine given names